The 1909 World Greco-Roman Wrestling Championship were held in Vienna, Cisleithania, Austria-Hungary.

Medal table

Medal summary

Men's Greco-Roman

References
FILA Database

World Wrestling Championships
W
W
W